Epigenetic therapy is the use of drugs or other epigenome-influencing techniques to treat medical conditions. Many diseases, including cancer, heart disease, diabetes, and mental illnesses are influenced by epigenetic mechanisms. Epigenetic therapy offers a potential way to influence those pathways directly.

Background 

Epigenetics refers to the study of changes in gene expressions that do not result from alterations in the DNA sequence'. Altered gene expression patterns can result from chemical modifications in DNA and chromatin, to changes in several regulatory mechanisms. Epigenetic markings can be inherited in some cases, and can change in response to environmental stimuli over the course of an organism's life.

Many diseases are known to have a genetic component, but the epigenetic mechanisms underlying many conditions are still being discovered. A significant number of diseases are known to change the expression of genes within the body, and epigenetic involvement is a plausible hypothesis for how they do this. These changes can be the cause of symptoms to the disease. Several diseases, especially cancer, have been suspected of selectively turning genes on or off, thereby resulting in a capability for the tumorous tissues to escape the host’s immune reaction.

Known epigenetic mechanisms typically cluster into three categories. The first is DNA methylation, where a cytosine residue that is followed by a guanine residue (CpG) is methylated. In general, DNA methylation attracts proteins which fold that section of the chromatin and repress the related genes. The second category is histone modifications. Histones are proteins which are involved in the folding and compaction of the chromatin. There are several different types of histones, and they can be chemically modified in a number of ways. Acetylation of histone tails typically leads to weaker interactions between the histones and the DNA, which is associated with gene expression. Histones can be modified in many positions, with many different types of chemical modifications, but the precise details of the histone code are currently unknown.  The final category of epigenetic mechanism is regulatory RNA. MicroRNAs are small, noncoding sequences that are involved in gene expression. Thousands of miRNAs are known, and the extent of their involvement in epigenetic regulation is an area of ongoing research. Epigenetic therapies are reversible, unlike gene therapy. This means that they are druggable for targeted therapies.

Potential applications of therapies that have epigenetic mechanisms

Diabetic retinopathy 
Diabetes is a disease where an affected individual is unable to convert food into energy. When left untreated, the condition can lead to other, more severe complications. A common sign of diabetes is the degradation of blood vessels in various tissues throughout the body. Retinopathy refers to damage from this process in the retina, the part of the eye that senses light. Diabetic retinopathy is known to be associated with a number of epigenetic markers, including methylation of the Sod2 and MMP-9 genes, an increase in transcription of LSD1, a H3K4 and H3K9 demethylase, and various DNA Methyl-Transferases (DNMTs), and increased presence of miRNAs for transcription factors and VEGF.

It is believed that much of the retinal vascular degeneration characteristic of diabetic retinopathy is due to impaired mitochondrial activity in the retina. Sod2 codes for a superoxide disputes enzyme, which scavenges free radicals and prevents oxidative damage to cells. LSD1 may play a major role in diabetic retinopathy through the downregulation of Sod2 in retinal vascular tissue, leading to oxidative damage in those cells. MMP-9 is believed to be involved in cellular apoptosis, and is similarly downregulated, which may help to propagate the effects of diabetic retinopathy.

Several avenues to epigenetic treatment of diabetic retinopathy have been studied. One approach is to inhibit the methylation of the Sod2 and MMP-9. The DNMT inhibitors 5-azacytidine and 5-aza-20-deoxycytidine have both been approved by the FDA for the treatment of other conditions, and studies have examined the effects of those compounds on diabetic retinopathy, where they seem to inhibit these methylation patterns with some success at reducing symptoms. The DNA methylation inhibitor Zebularine has also been studied, although results are currently inconclusive. A second approach is to attempt to reduce the miRNAs observed at elevated levels in retinopathic patients, although the exact role of those miRNAs is still unclear. The Histone Acetyltransferase (HAT) inhibitors Epigallocatechin-3-gallate, Vorinostat, and Romidepsin have also been the subject of experimentation for this purpose, with some limited success.  The possibility of using Small Interfering RNAs, or siRNAs, to target the miRNAs mentioned above has been discussed, but there are currently no known methods to do so. This method is somewhat hindered by the difficulty involved in delivering the siRNAs to the affected tissues.

Type 2 diabetes mellitus (T2DM) has many variations and factors that influence how it affects the body. DNA methylation is a process by which methyl groups attach to DNA structure causing the gene to not be expressed. This is thought to be an epigenetic cause of T2DM by causing the body to develop an insulin resistance and inhibit the production of beta cells in the pancreas. Because of the repressed genes the body does not regulate blood sugar transport to cells, causing a high concentration of glucose in the blood stream.

Another variation of T2DM is mitochondrial reactive oxygen species (ROS) which causes a lack of antioxidants in the blood. This leads to oxidation stress of cells leading to the release of free radicals inhibiting blood glucose regulation and hyperglycemic conditions. This leads to persistent vascular complications that can inhibit blood flow to limbs and the eyes. This persistent hyperglycemic environment is leads to DNA methylation as well because the chemistry within chromatin in the nucleus is affected.

Current medicine used by T2DM sufferers includes Metformin hydrochloride which stimulates production in the pancreas and promotes insulin sensitivity. A number of preclinical studies have suggested that adding a treatment to metformin that would inhibit acetylation and methylation of DNA and histone complexes. DNA methylation occurs throughout the human genome and is believed to be a natural method of suppressing genes during development. Treatments targeting specific genes with methylation and acetylation inhibitors is being studied and debated.

With Exposure therapy for Fear, anxiety, and trauma 
Traumatic experiences can lead to a number of mental problems including posttraumatic stress disorder. It was previously thought that PTSD could be treated with advances in cognitive behavioral therapy methods like Exposure therapy. In exposure therapy, patients are exposed to stimuli which provokes fear and anxiety. In theory, repeated exposure can led to a decreased connection between the stimuli and the anxiety. While exposure therapy helps many patients, there are many patients who do not experience improvement in their symptoms while others may experience more symptoms.

The biochemical mechanisms underlying these systems are not completely understood. However, brain-derived neurotrophic factor (BDNF) and the N-methyl-D-aspartate receptors (NMDA) have been identified as crucial in the exposure therapy process. Successful exposure therapy is associated with increased acetylation of these two genes, leading to transcriptional activation of these genes, which appears to increase neural plasticity. For these reasons, increasing the acetylation of these two genes has been a major area of recent research into the treatment of anxiety disorders.

Exposure therapy’s effectiveness in rodents is increased by the administration of Vorinostat, Entinostat, TSA, sodium butyrate, and VPA, all known histone deacetylase inhibitors. Several studies in the past two years have shown that in humans, Vorinostat and Entinostat increase the clinical effectiveness of exposure therapy as well, and human trials using the drugs successful in rodents are planned. In addition to research on the effectiveness of HDAC inhibitors, some researchers have suggested that histone acetyltransferase activators might have a similar effect, although not enough research has been completed to draw any conclusions. However, none of these drugs are likely to be able to replace exposure therapy or other cognitive behavioral therapy methods. Rodent studies have indicated that administration of HDAC inhibitors without successful exposure therapy actually worsens anxiety disorders significantly, although the mechanism for this trend is unknown.  The most likely explanation is that exposure therapy works by a learning process, and can be enhanced by processes which increase neural plasticity and learning. However, if a subject is exposed to a stimulus which causes anxiety in such a way that their fear does not decrease, compounds which increase learning may also increase re-consolidation, ultimately strengthening the memory.

Cardiac dysfunction 
A number of cardiac dysfunctions have been linked to cytosine methylation patterns. DNMT deficient mice show upregulation of inflammatory mediators, which cause increased atherosclerosis and inflammation.  Atherosclerotic tissue has increased methylation in the promoter region for the estrogen gene, although any connection between the two is unknown. Hypermethylation of the HSD11B2 gene, which catalyzes conversions between cortisone and cortisol, and is therefore influential in the stress response in mammals, has been correlated with hypertension. Decreased LINE-1 methylation is a strong predictive indicator of ischemic heart disease and stroke, although the mechanism is unknown. Various impairments in lipid metabolism, leading to clogging of arteries, has been associated with the hypermethylation of GNASAS, IL-10, MEG3, ABCA1, and the hypomethylation of INSIGF and IGF2. Additionally, upregulation of a number of miRNAs has been shown to be associated with acute myocardial infarction, coronary artery disease, and heart failure. Strong research efforts into this area are very recent, with all of the aforementioned discoveries being made since 2009. Mechanisms are entirely speculative at this point, and an area of future research.

Epigenetic treatment methods for cardiac dysfunction are still highly speculative. SiRNA therapy targeting the miRNAs mentioned above is being investigated. The primary area of research in this field is on using epigenetic methods to increase the regeneration of cardiac tissues damaged by various diseases.

Cancer 

The role of epigenetics in cancer has been the subject of intensive study. For the purposes of epigenetic therapy, the two key findings from this research are that cancers frequently use epigenetic mechanisms to deactivate cellular antitumor systems and that most human cancers epigenetically activate oncogenes, such as the MYC proto-oncogene, at some point in their development. For more information on the exact epigenetic changes which take place in cancerous tissues, see the Cancer epigenetics page.

The DNMT inhibitors 5-azacytidine and 5-aza-20-deoxycytidine mentioned above have both been approved by the FDA for the treatment of various forms of cancer. These drugs have been shown to reactivate the cellular antitumor systems repressed by the cancer, enabling the body to weaken the tumor. Zebularine, an activator of a demethylation enzyme has also been used with some success. Because of their wide-ranging effects throughout the entire organism, all of these drugs have major side effects, but survival rates are increased significantly when they are used for treatment.

Dietary polyphenols, such as those found in green tea and red wine, are linked to antitumor activity, and are known to epigenetically influence many systems within the human body. An epigenetic mechanism for polyphenol anti-cancer effects seems likely, although beyond the basic finding that global DNA methylation rates decrease in response to increased consumption of polyphenol compounds, no specific information is known.

Recent study has shown a role of BET inhibitors in colorectal cancer. It has been indicated that a combination of signaling pathway inhibitors and Bromodomain domain inhibitors (i.e. i-BET 151) could have synergistic impact on various genomic and epigenomic subtypes of colorectal cancer.

Schizophrenia 

Research findings have demonstrated that schizophrenia is linked to numerous epigenetic alterations, including DNA methylation and histone modifications. For example, the therapeutic efficacy of schizophrenic drugs such as antipsychotics are limited by epigenetic alterations and future studies are looking into the related biochemical mechanisms to improve the efficacy of such therapies. Even if epigenetic therapy wouldn't allow to fully reverse the disease, it can significantly improve the quality of life.

See also 
 Pharmacoepigenetics

References 

Epigenetics
Genetic mapping